Alexander Marshall Paterson (31 October 1885 – 29 July 1933) was a New Zealand rugby union player. A loose forward, Paterson represented  at a provincial level each side of World War I, and was a member of the New Zealand national side, the All Blacks, in 1908 and 1910. He played nine matches for the All Blacks including five internationals.

Paterson collapsed and died suddenly while at a rugby match at Carisbrook on 29 July 1933, and was buried at Andersons Bay Cemetery.

References

1885 births
1933 deaths
Rugby union players from Dunedin
New Zealand rugby union players
New Zealand international rugby union players
Otago rugby union players
Rugby union flankers
Burials at Andersons Bay Cemetery